Lieutenant-Colonel Sir William Fitzwilliam Lenox-Conyngham,  (25 April 1824 – 4 December 1906) was an Irish soldier.

The eldest son of William Lenox-Conyngham and Charlotte Melosina Staples, third daughter of the Rt Hon. John Staples (of Lissan House), he was born at Springhill, County Londonderry and was a Deputy Lieutenant, Justice of the Peace and High Sheriff of County Tyrone.  He married Laura Calvert Arbuthnot (1830-1917) and had thirteen children; William Arbuthnot Lenox-Conyngham, Rev. George Hugh Lenox-Conyngham, Elizabeth Mary Clark, John Staples Molesworth Lenox-Conyngham, Charlotte Melosina Leonox-Conyngham, Arthur Beresford Lenox-Conyngham, Sir Gerald Ponsonby Lenox-Conyngham, Ernest Lenox-Conyngham, Edward Fraser Lenox-Conyngham, Hubert Lenox-Conyngham, Alwyn Lenox-Conyngham, Laura Eleanor Duff and (Harriet) Alice Katherine Lenox-Conyngham (a passenger on the RMS Titanic).

When he retired as a soldier (with the Royal Artillery Militia) he was rewarded with a knighthood. He also, after 1882, accepted the Agency of the Drapers' Company in Londonderry and in this capacity lived in the Manor House, Moneymore. When, after the passing of the Ashbourne Act, the lands of the Drapers' Company were sold, Sir William and his family went for a short time to live in England, where Sir William died in 1906.

References

1824 births
1906 deaths
British Militia officers
Deputy Lieutenants of Tyrone
Royal Artillery officers
Knights Commander of the Order of the Bath
Irish justices of the peace
Military personnel from County Londonderry
High Sheriffs of Tyrone
Lenox-Conyngham family